Josiah Judah (born August 21, 1978) is an American former professional boxer.

He is the brother of welterweight champion Zab Judah and former U.S. Boxing Association light heavyweight champion Daniel Judah. Judah has fought on the undercard of brother Zab Judah's fights. His trainer is his father, Yoel Judah.

Miscellaneous
Judah and his family are Black Hebrew Israelites, who declared themselves as "Jewish".

Professional boxing record

References

External links
 

Judah family
1978 births
Living people
Black Hebrew Israelite people
American male boxers
Light-heavyweight boxers